Unalga Island is an island in the Delarof Islands subgroup of the Andreanof Islands in the Aleutian Islands chain of Alaska.

References

External links

Delarof Islands
Islands of Alaska
Islands of Unorganized Borough, Alaska